Directo Hasta Arriba is the first solo album by Mexican rapper Dharius, after he released 5 albums with Cartel de Santa. It was released on December 9, 2014. The album features guest appearances from Sick Jacken, Billy Kent, Revel Day and Alkhol.

Track listing

 Estilo Malandro
 La Raja
 Internacional
 Homicidha (ft. Revel Day, Billy Kent & Alkhol)
 Serenata Rap
 Lírica Onírica
 Directo Hasta Arriba
 Qué Buen Fieston
 El After Porky
 La Vidha Loca (ft. Sick Jacken)
 Por Allá Los Washo

References

2014 debut albums
Dharius albums